The Taipei Metro Taipei Bridge station is a station on the Xinzhuang Line located in Sanchong District, New Taipei, Taiwan, two blocks from the approach to Taipei Bridge for which the station is named. The station opened for service on 5 January 2012.

Station overview
This six-level, underground station has two, stacked side platforms. It is located beneath Chongxin Rd., Sec. 1 between Wenhua North and South Rd. and Zhongyang North and South Rd. It was originally scheduled to open in March 2012 along with most of the Xinzhuang Line, but opened for service earlier on 5 January 2012.

Construction
The station has one entrance, one accessibility elevator, and two vent shafts. Two emergency exits are integrated with a joint development building. Public art is featured on the walls of the main entrance.

Design
The station is based on a theme of "Sunset-bathed Iron Bridge" (referring to Taipei Bridge), with images of the Tamsui River, Guanyin Mountain, and a "bazaar culture".

Station layout

Exits
Single Exit: No. 108, Chongxin Rd. Sec. 1

Around the station
Taipei Bridge
Sanhe Night Market
Central Market
Sanchong Farmers Association
Lin Rong-San (between this station and Cailiao station)
Tiantai Plaza
Zhengyi Elementary School
Guangxing Elementary School

References

Zhonghe–Xinlu line stations
Railway stations opened in 2012